In mathematics, there is in mathematical analysis a class of Sobolev inequalities, relating norms including those of Sobolev spaces. These are used to prove the Sobolev embedding theorem, giving inclusions between certain Sobolev spaces, and the Rellich–Kondrachov theorem showing that under slightly stronger conditions some Sobolev spaces are compactly embedded in others. They are named after Sergei Lvovich Sobolev.

Sobolev embedding theorem

then

and the embedding is continuous.

This special case of the Sobolev embedding is a direct consequence of the Gagliardo–Nirenberg–Sobolev inequality. (Note that , so that .)

The second part of the Sobolev embedding theorem applies to embeddings in Hölder spaces . If  and

with  then one has the embedding

This part of the Sobolev embedding is a direct consequence of Morrey's inequality. Intuitively, this inclusion expresses the fact that the existence of sufficiently many weak derivatives implies some continuity of the classical derivatives. If  then  for every .

Generalizations
The Sobolev embedding theorem holds for Sobolev spaces  on other suitable domains . In particular, both parts of the Sobolev embedding hold when
  is a compact Riemannian manifold
  is a compact Riemannian manifold with boundary and the boundary is Lipschitz (meaning that the boundary can be locally represented as a graph of a Lipschitz continuous function).
  is a complete Riemannian manifold with injectivity radius  and bounded sectional curvature.

Kondrachov embedding theorem

On a compact manifold  with  boundary, the Kondrachov embedding theorem states that if  andthen the Sobolev embedding

is completely continuous (compact). Note that the condition is just as in the first part of the Sobolev embedding theorem, with the equality replaced by an inequality, thus requiring a more regular space .

Gagliardo–Nirenberg–Sobolev inequality

 

with 1/p* = 1/p - 1/n.
The case  is due to Sobolev,  to Gagliardo and Nirenberg independently.  The Gagliardo–Nirenberg–Sobolev inequality implies directly the Sobolev embedding

Hardy–Littlewood–Sobolev lemma
Sobolev's original proof of the Sobolev embedding theorem relied on the following, sometimes known as the Hardy–Littlewood–Sobolev fractional integration theorem.

Then, for  defined by

there exists a constant  depending only on  such that

If , then one has two possible replacement estimates.  The first is the more classical weak-type estimate:

where .  Alternatively one has the estimatewhere  is the vector-valued Riesz transform, c.f.   .  The boundedness of the Riesz transforms implies that the latter inequality gives a unified way to write the family of inequalities for the Riesz potential.

The Hardy–Littlewood–Sobolev lemma implies the Sobolev embedding essentially by the relationship between the Riesz transforms and the Riesz potentials.

Morrey's inequality
Assume .

for all , where

Thus if , then  is in fact Hölder continuous of exponent , after possibly being redefined on a set of measure 0.

A similar result holds in a bounded domain  with Lipschitz boundary.  In this case,

The inequality is named after Charles B. Morrey Jr.

General Sobolev inequalities
( may also be unbounded, but in this case its boundary, if it exists, must be sufficiently well-behaved.)

Assume . Then we consider two cases:

In this case we conclude that , where

We have in addition the estimate

,

Here, we conclude that  belongs to a Hölder space, more precisely:

where

We have in addition the estimate

In particular, the condition  guarantees that  is continuous (and actually Hölder continuous with some positive exponent).

Case 
If , then  is a function of bounded mean oscillation and

This estimate is a corollary of the Poincaré inequality.

Nash inequality

The inequality follows from basic properties of the Fourier transform.  Indeed, integrating over the complement of the ball of radius ,

because . On the other hand, one has

which, when integrated over the ball of radius  gives

where  is the volume of the -ball.

gives the inequality.

In fact, if  is a bounded interval, then for all  and all  the following inequality holds

where:

Logarithmic Sobolev inequality

We can see that as  tends to infinity,  approaches . In particular, for functions on an infinite-dimensional space, we cannot expect any direct analog of the classical Sobolev embedding theorems.

There is, however, a type of Sobolev inequality, established by Leonard Gross and known as a logarithmic Sobolev inequality, that has dimension-independent constants and therefore continues to hold in the infinite-dimensional setting. The inequality expressing this fact has constants that do not involve the dimension of the space and, thus, the inequality holds in the setting of a Gaussian measure on an infinite-dimensional space. It is now known that logarithmic Sobolev inequalities hold for many different types of measures, not just Gaussian measures.

References

.

.

, Translated from the Russian by T. O. Shaposhnikova.
.
.

Inequalities
Sobolev spaces
Compactness theorems